Winpos Arena is an indoor arena in Umeå, Sweden.  It is the home arena of the IF Björklöven and Tegs SK ice hockey teams. Its current capacity is 5,400 spectators. 

The arena was first opened on 17 December 1963 as Umeå ishall and rebuilt as Umeå Arena in 2001, which was the name until 2005. On 1 October 2008, the name was reverted to Umeå Arena after a new sponsor deal. 

On 17 September 2013, the arena was renamed T3 Center after the Swedish telecommunication company T3 bought the naming rights for at least the following five seasons (through the 2017–18 season).

See also
List of indoor arenas in Sweden
List of indoor arenas in Nordic countries

References

External links
Pictures and facts (unofficial)

Indoor ice hockey venues in Sweden
Ice hockey venues in Sweden
Buildings and structures in Umeå
Sports venues completed in 1963
1963 establishments in Sweden